
Roadster may refer to:

Transportation
 Roadster (automobile), an open, two-seat, often sporty car
 Roadster utility, an automobile with an open-topped roadster body and a rear cargo bed
 Roadster (bicycle), a utilitarian bicycle, typically traditional in design
 Roadster (horse), a type of driving competition for horses
 A roadster motorcycle, another name for a standard

Vehicle models

Cars
 Haynes Roadster, a roadster sports car
 Mazda MX-5, a sports car known as the Mazda Roadster in Japan 
 Morgan Roadster, a roadster sports car
 Panoz Roadster, a sports car
 Smart Roadster, a sports car
 Singer Roadster, a roadster touring car
 Tesla Roadster (first generation), an all-electric sports car
Elon Musk's Tesla Roadster Elon Musk's Tesla Roadster launched in to deep space by SpaceX
 Tesla Roadster (second generation), an upcoming all-electric sports car
 Triumph Roadster, a roadster touring car

Motorcycles
 Cagiva Roadster, a motorcycle

Video games 
Roadster, a game in the Sports Collection, Japan-exclusive Game Boy video game
Roadsters (video game) released for Nintendo 64, Sega Dreamcast, Sony PlayStation and Game Boy Color

See also
 Speedster (disambiguation)